Olle Nordberg (9 June 1905 – 28 March 1986) was a Swedish painter. His work was part of the painting event in the art competition at the 1936 Summer Olympics.

References

1905 births
1986 deaths
20th-century Swedish painters
Swedish male painters
Olympic competitors in art competitions
People from Ekerö Municipality
20th-century Swedish male artists